Magnus Merriman is a 1934 comedy novel by the British writer Eric Linklater. It portrays the adventures of an aspiring politician who marries and settles down on Orkney. It had a strong autobiographical element as Linklater had himself unsuccessfully stood in the 1933 East Fife by-election for the National Party of Scotland.

References

Bibliography
 Hart, Francis Russell.  The Scottish Novel: From Smollett to Spark. Harvard University Press, 1978.
 Watson, Roderick. The Literature of Scotland. Macmillan International Higher Education, 2016.

1934 British novels
Novels by Eric Linklater
Novels set in Scotland
Novels set in London
British comedy novels
Jonathan Cape books
Farrar & Rinehart books